Delias kummeri is a butterfly in the family Pieridae. It was described by Carl Ribbe in 1900. It is found in New Guinea.

Subspecies
D. k. kummeri (Aroa River, Papua New Guinea)
D. k. athena Yagishita, 1993 (Fakfak, Irian Jaya)
D. k. chiekoae Nakano, 1995 (Mapia, Weyland Mountains, Irian Jaya)
D. k. fumosa Roepke, 1955 (Araucaria River, Irian Jaya)
D. k. highlandensis Yagishita, 1993 (Central Highlands, Papua New Guinea)
D. k. rouffaer Yagishita, 1993 (Central Mountains, Irian Jaya)
D. k. similis Talbot, 1928 (Arfak Mountains, Irian Jaya)

References

External links
Delias at Markku Savela's Lepidoptera and Some Other Life Forms

kummeri
Butterflies described in 1900